Chrysilla lauta is the type species of the jumping spider genus Chrysilla. It occurs in rain forest from Burma to China and Vietnam. Although known since 1887, it has only been described from male specimens.

Description
The male is very slender. Its carapace is orange-red, with a narrow bluish-white, iridescent transverse stripe between the eyes. The robust chelicerae do not point forward. The long scutum of the opisthosoma is dark brown and covered with dense, bronze-colored hairs. The long legs are brownish-yellow, with the first pair, and the last segments of the others brown.

Footnotes

References
  (2000): An Introduction to the Spiders of South East Asia. Malaysian Nature Society, Kuala Lumpur.
  (2007): The world spider catalog, version 8.0. American Museum of Natural History.

External links
 Salticidae.org: Color photograph of the male

Salticidae
Spiders of Asia
Spiders described in 1887
Taxa named by Tamerlan Thorell